Myroslav Mykhailovych Slaboshpytskyi (born October 17, 1974) is a Ukrainian film director.

Biography 
Slaboshpytskyi was born to Ukrainian writer and literary critic Mykhailo Slaboshpytskyi. Until 1982 he lived in Lviv.

Slaboshpytskyi graduated from National University of Theater, Film, and TV in Kyiv with a focus in film and television directing. He has worked as a reporter and written scripts for film and television. In the early 1990s. he worked at the Dovzhenko Film Studios.

Since 2000 he has been a Member of the Ukrainian Association of Cinematographers. He was vice-president of the Association of Young Filmmakers of Ukraine.

In 2002, due to a conflict with the head of the State Cinematography Service Anna Chmil, he went to Russia to St. Petersburg, where he began working as a screenwriter and second director on a number of projects. He worked at the Lenfilm film studio in St. Petersburg, in particular on the series “Detachment” with Igor Lifanov and others.

In 2014, Slaboshpytskyi broke on the scene with his film The Tribe, which premiered at the Cannes Film Festival. The film is entirely in Ukrainian Sign Language with no subtitles. It won the Nespresso Grand Prize, as well as the France 4 Visionary Award and the Gan Foundation Support for Distribution Award at the 2014 Cannes Film Festival's International Critics' Week section.

On 24 October 2018, it was announced that Slaboshpytskyi would direct film Tiger, based on the 2010 non-fiction book by John Vaillant. Focus acquired the book in 2010 and at one point the project was seen as a potential acting vehicle for Brad Pitt and a directing job for Darren Aronofsky. In the end, the two have decided to stay on as producers and allow Slaboshpystskyi to step in to direct.

Filmography

As actor 
 1995 : The Guard (short film)
 1999 :

Interesting facts 
Slaboshpytskyi was a close friend of now deceased Ukrainian modern writer Oles Ulianenko.

References

External links 

 
 

Living people
1974 births
Film people from Kyiv
Kyiv National I. K. Karpenko-Kary Theatre, Cinema and Television University alumni
European Film Awards winners (people)
Ukrainian screenwriters
Ukrainian film directors
Laureates of the Oleksandr Dovzhenko State Prize